Candice Pillay (born June 10, 1981) is a South African singer-songwriter based in Los Angeles. She is best known for writing songs for artists including Rihanna, Kendrick Lamar, Calvin Harris, Christina Aguilera, Dr. Dre, Eminem, ScHoolboy Q, Why Don't We, Rita Ora, Sevyn Streeter, Logan Paul and Tinie Tempah.

Career
Pillay was born and raised in Pietermaritzburg, South Africa in an Indian family. She  released her first mixtape in December 2014. The mixtape, titled The Mood Kill, is a 15-song compilation written by Pillay and collaborators such as Alex da Kid and Dem Jointz. In August 2015, Pillay's vocals were featured on two songs from Dr. Dre's  album "Compton"; "Medicine Man" (ft. Eminem and Anderson .Paak). In an interview with MTV, Pillay spoke about working with Dr. Dre stating, "He really made an impression on me from the moment I met him. Of course, he's a legendary guy. We all look up to him. You never know what to expect when you meet someone of his caliber. But, from the first meeting, he was one of the most humble guys I've met."

In 2015, Candice co-wrote Rihanna's American Oxygen in a collaborative effort with Alex Da Kid and her KIDinaKORNER label-mates X Ambassadors. Pillay told reporters the song hit close to home for herself, Alex Da Kid and Rihanna who all moved to America to further their careers in the music industry. In September 2020, Pillay released Stand Silent ft. Jon Connor in the midst of protests following the murder of George Floyd. In April 2021, Candice announced her upcoming EP, The Rise

Influences 
In an interview with Toronto Paradise, Candice spoke about her musical influences. "I have African and Indian heritage, and mixing the African and Indian rhythms and drums together is very close to RnB and hip hop," she said. "A lot of my melodies are very Indian and you wouldn't think that because they're under a heavy 808, but I try to access all those cultures that I grew up on."

Discography

Singles

As a featured artist

As lead artist

As a songwriter

References

1981 births
Living people
People from Pietermaritzburg
South African singer-songwriters
South African people of Indian descent
South African people of Tamil descent